Leopold Neumer (8 February 1919 – 19 March 1990) was an Austrian-German football striker.

Career
He earned 4 caps and scored 2 goals for the Austria national football team. After the annexation of Austria by Germany, he earned 1 cap for the Germany national football team, and participated in the 1938 FIFA World Cup. He spent his club career at FK Austria Wien.

References

1919 births
1990 deaths
Association football forwards
Austrian footballers
Austria international footballers
German footballers
Germany international footballers
FK Austria Wien players
1938 FIFA World Cup players
Dual internationalists (football)